Inside the Dub Plates is the fourth studio album by New Zealand dub group Salmonella Dub, released in 2001. Salmonella Dub employed their old engineer David Wernham (currently with Shihad) to record all their live instrumentation on this album as well as Paddy Free to co-produce.

Track listing
"Problems"
"Platetectonics (Fartyboom)"
"Love Your Ways"
"Wytaliba"
"Tha Bromley East Roller"
"Gospel According To Mant"
"Push On Thru"
"Loop 7"
"Ramblings From The Anatoki"
"Tui Dub"

Salmonella Dub albums
2001 albums